Twist of Faith is a 2004 American documentary film about a man who confronts the Catholic Church about the abuse he suffered as a teenager.

Twist of Faith may also refer to:

A Twist of Faith, 1999 American film starring Andrew McCarthy
Twist of Faith (2013 film), American Lifetime network television film
Twist of Faith, 2007 Star Trek: Deep Space Nine novel by S.D. Perry, David Weddle and Jeffrey Lang, Keith DeCandido
Twist of Faith: The Story of Anne Beiler, Founder of Auntie Anne's Pretzels, 2008 memoir by Anne F. Beiler with Shawn Smucker
Twist of Faith, 2011 album by Norwegian metal band Highland Glory

See also
Twist of Fate (disambiguation)